Kranj is the third-largest city in Slovenia, with a population of 37,941 (2020). The centre of the City Municipality of Kranj and of the traditional region of Upper Carniola (northwestern Slovenia) is a mainly industrial city with significant electronics and rubber industries.

Geography
The nucleus of the city is a well-preserved medieval old town, built at the confluence of the Kokra and Sava rivers. The city is served by the Kranj railway station on the route from Ljubljana to Munich, Germany (via Jesenice and Villach, Austria) and a highway. Slovenia's national airport, Ljubljana Jože Pučnik Airport (in Brnik) is also very close to Kranj, considerably more so than to its nominal client, Ljubljana.

Kosorep, on the northern outskirts of Kranj, is a picturesque site along the river. Parts of the canyon can be reached by a walking trail. Due to the dam for the Mavčiče Hydroelectric Plant, the river's flow there is very slow.

Climate 
Kranj has a warm-summer humid continental climate (Köppen climate classification Dfb).

Etymology
Kranj was attested in written sources in the 5th century and c. 670 as Carnium (and as via Chreinariorum in 973, actum Kreine in 1050–65, in loco Chreina in 1065–77, and Chrainburch in 1291). The Slovene name is derived from Slavic *Korn’ь, borrowed from Romance Carnium in late antiquity. Like the Latin regional name Carnia, it is derived from the northern Italic (Celtic) tribe known as the Carnī (Greek: Κάρνοι). The name of the tribe is probably derived from the Celtic root *karno- 'peak, hill, pile of stones'. The German name of the town was Krainburg. The name of the historical region of Carniola is a Latin diminutive form of Carnia.

History

Prehistory and antiquity
Archaeological finds show that Kranj was settled in prehistoric times. Discoveries include a bronze ax found in Drulovka, Hallstatt-era graves in the northern part of the town above the bank of the Kokra River, testifying to Illyrian settlement, and a burial site in the southern part of the town above the left bank of the Sava River, indicating a Celtic settlement. The Romans founded the settlement of Carnium at the confluence of the Sava and Kokra. In the 6th century, a major Germanic settlement stood at the same site, and an Ostrogothic cemetery was discovered nearby. The Gothic settlement was continued by the Lombards and existed until c. AD 580, when it was destroyed by invading Slavs.

Middle Ages
Traces of the old Slavic settlement (a Slavic burial site) date from the 9th and 10th centuries. As the seat of the margraves of Carniola in the 11th century, it was the most important settlement in the territory. The town itself is believed to have developed in the early 13th century; citizens of the town of Kranj appear in a document from 1221, and Kranj was officially referred to as a town in 1256. It was the seat of a court whose jurisdiction extended between that of Radovljica and Kamnik. In 1414 a decision was issued relieving the citizens of the town from paying tolls. In 1422 an ordinance required houses to be built of stone to prevent fires. A parish school was established in Kranj in 1423, and the same year the right was granted to Kranj to elect its own judge. Kranj was laid waste in 1471 in an Ottoman attack. Emperor Frederick III granted Kranj the right to collect tolls in documents from 1488 and 1493, and a 1493 document also granted the town the right to hold fairs twice a year. The town hospice records date back to the 15th century.

Crafts developed in Kranj during the Middle Ages. Mills first developed along the Sava and Kokra rivers, and this was followed by butchers, fur merchants, hide and wood processors, and then weavers of canvas and woolen cloth. Habsburg efforts to maintain Vienna's monopoly on trade with Italy resulted in trade routes bypassing Kranj.

Renaissance
Kranj was affected by peasant revolts in the 16th century; the leaders of the 1515 peasant revolt were beheaded in Kranj, and in 1525, when a new revolt threatened Carniola, hussars commanded by Johann Katzianer occupied the town and caused more damage than the Ottomans had inflicted half a century earlier. In 1668 half of the houses in Kranj were destroyed by a fire, and the entire town burned in 1749. Kranj was affected by plague outbreaks in 1552, 1557, 1625, 1627, and 1657. In the mid-16th century, most of the townspeople converted to Protestantism; the merchants of Kranj opened a Protestant school and Slovenian books by Protestant authors were imported from Germany. The Protestant Reformation in Kranj was led by Gašpar Rokavec, who was succeeded by Jernej Knafel after his death. Knafel was forced to withdraw from Kranj to Brdo Castle during the Counter-Reformation.

Economically, teamster services developed in Kranj in the 16th century, with connections to the rest of Upper Carniola and Carinthia. There were also several blacksmith workshops and two foundries along the Sava River. Sieve-making also developed at this time; horsehair was imported from around Europe and the sieves were exported to France, Belgium, Germany, and Greece. Several breweries and leather works operated in the town. Kranj went into an economic decline in the 17th century, when there was much emigration from the town, leaving many houses empty, and business did not revive again until the second half of the 18th century.

Modern era

Kranj was affected by plague outbreaks in 1836 and 1855. A Slovene reading room was established in 1863. Artisans' workshops became established in Kranj in the 19th century, with roots going back to a number of painters in the 17th and 18th centuries. Prominent among these was the workshop of Josip Egartner Jr. (1833–1905), who settled in Kranj in 1875. An upper secondary school was established in 1861, and a vocational school for textile workers opened in 1930. A water supply system was installed in Kranj in 1901, supplied by Čemšenik Spring on the Kokra River.

There was limited industry in Kranj until the late 19th century. Until this time, trade in agricultural products, livestock, and wood was economically most important. A leather factory was established in 1875. Large-scale industrialization occurred after the First World War, starting with the founding of a rubber factory in 1921. The Jugo-Češka textile works was established in 1923. Additional textile works were established after this, making Kranj one of the most important centers of textile manufacturing in pre-war Yugoslavia. A major strike by textile workers occurred in 1936, when they occupied the factories. Two shoe factories were established in 1925, and a bakery in 1937.

Second World War

During the Second World War, Kranj, along with the rest of northern Slovenia, was annexed by Nazi Germany. The German authorities dismantled the Jugo-Češka textile works, replacing the machinery with equipment to produce aircraft. On 21 March 1944, German forces discovered several communist activists and functionaries at the Šorli Mill in Rupa in the northern part of the town, where military supplies for the Partisans were being stored. Three of the men at the mill were killed and the German forces then burned the mill.

Mass grave
Kranj is the site of a mass grave from the period immediately after the Second World War. The Planina Mass Grave is located in a small woods in a field near the city cemetery. It contains the remains of an undetermined number of people murdered after the war; the victims may be German prisoners of war, Home Guard soldiers repatriated from Austria, or Slovene civilians from Kranj and the surrounding area.

Economy
Kranj is an industrial city. It experienced a wave of deindustrialisation with many of its factories going bankrupt following independence in 1991, leaving behind several brownfields. In recent years, its manufacturing sector has become more based around highly-competitive export-oriented industries. Major industrial companies operating in Kranj include Goodyear (under their subsidiary Goodyear Dunlop Sava), Iskratel and Hidria.

Landmarks

St. Cantianus and Companions Parish Church
The St. Cantianus and Companions Parish Church is the largest church in Kranj and also the seat of the Kranj Parish and Deaconates. It was built in the 14th century, and measures . Construction was commissioned by the counts of Kranj.

Kieselstein Castle

The castle was built in the mid-16th century by Baron Johann Jakob Khisl. Later owners included the families of Moscon, Ravbar, Apfaltrer, Auersperg, and Pagliaruzzi. The building was renovated in 1952 by the architect Jože Plečnik in his late period. The castle garden is currently used as a concert setting.

Culture
The city is known for its sports facilities, including soccer, tennis and basketball, as well as the biggest aquatic centre in the country, which hosted the 2003 Men's European Water Polo Championship (along with Ljubljana, hosting the women's competition). The annual Teden Mladih (Youth Week) festival and Carniola Festival are very popular.

Gallery

Twin towns — sister cities

Kranj is twinned with:

 Banja Luka, Bosnia and Herzegovina
 Bitola, North Macedonia
 Büyükçekmece, Turkey
 La Ciotat, France
 Colorado Springs, United States
 Doberdò del Lago, Italy
 Eisenkappel-Vellach, Austria
 Grožnjan, Croatia
 Herceg Novi, Montenegro
 Kočani, North Macedonia
 Kotor Varoš, Bosnia and Herzegovina
 Oldham, England, United Kingdom
 Pula, Croatia
 Rivoli, Italy
 Senta, Serbia
 Villach, Austria
 Zemun (Belgrade), Serbia
 Zhangjiakou, China

Notable people
Notable people that were born or lived in Kranj include:

Miroslav Ambrožič (1885–1944), physical education specialist
Janez Mihael Arh (1678–c. 1730), actor and singer
Franc Babič (1868–1913), merchant
Friderik Irenej Baraga (1797–1868), missionary
Ana Belac (born 1997), First slovenian to join the LPGA Tour
Žan Benedičič (born 1995), football player
Jurij Blatnik (born 1693), composer
Janez Bleiweis (1808–1881), politician
Franjo Bradaška (1829–1904), historian and geographer
Fran Čadež (1882–1942), physicist and meteorologist
Zvone Černe (1927–2007), industrialist
Karel Dobida (1896–1964), art historian and critic
Davorin Dolar (1921–2005), chemist
Lojze Dolinar (1893–1970), sculptor
Leon Engelman (1841–1862), port and writer
Vesna Fabjan (born 1985), cross country skier
Gregor Fučka (born 1971), Italian basketball player
Stojan Globočnik (1895–1985), designer and construction engineer
Alojzij Goetzl (1820–1905), sculptor and painter
Franc Serafin Goetzl (1783–1855), painter
Gašpar Luka Goetzl (1782–1852), painter
Josip Goetzl (1754–1806), painter
Karel Goetzl (1816–1892), sculptor and painter
Leopold Goetzl (1817–?), sculptor
Stanko Gogala (1901–1987), education specialist
Peter Graselli (1841–1933), politician
Primož Grašič (born 1968), guitarist
Anton Hayne (1786–1853), painter
Boštjan Hladnik (1929–2006), film director
Simon Jenko (1835–1869), poet
Bojan Jokić (born 1986), footballer
Ciril Metod Koch (1867–1925), architect
Robert Kranjec (born 1981), ski jumper
Anton Layer (1765–?), painter
Leopold Layer (1752–1828), painter
Marko Layer (1727–1808), painter
Valentin Layer (1763–1810), painter
Peter Lipar (1912–1980), composer
Peter Malec (1909–1986), theater director
Valentin Mandelc (1837–1872), writer and translator
Janez Mencinger (1838–1912), writer
Ernst Mally (1879–1944), philosopher
Mihael Markič (1864–1939), grammarian
Aleš Mejač (born 1983), footballer
Janez Michor (a. 1626–1686), sculptor
Marko Milič (born 1977), Slovenian basketball player
Franc Novak (1908–1999), gynecologist
Janez Jakob Olben (1643–1728), mathematician
Nikolaj Omersa (1878–1932), literary historian
Josip Paternoster (1847–1903), singer and theater actor

Borut Petrič and Darjan Petrič (born 1964), freestyle swimmers
Ciril Pirc (1865–1941), politician
Valentin Pleiweis (1814–1881), merchant
Lovrenc Pogačnik (1698–1768), Latin religious writer
Marko Pogačnik (born 1944), sculptor
Jan Polanc (born 1992), cyclist
Dragotin Poljanec (1892–1940), painter
Karel Pollak (1853–1937), merchant and industrialist
Ivan Pregelj (1883–1960), writer
Marij Pregelj (1913–1967), painter
France Prešeren (1800–1849), poet
Nina Prešiček (born 1976), classical pianist
Mirko Pretnar (1898–1962), poet and translator
Peter Prevc (born 1992), ski jumper
Janez Puhar (1814–1864),  inventor of a glass photography process
Aleksandar Radosavljević (born 1979), footballer
Ivan Rakovec (1866–1925), industrialist
Franc Remec (1846–1917), playwright
Franjo Roš (1898–1976), poet and children's writer
Ivan Rozman (1873–1960), writer and journalist
Marjan Rus (1905–1974), concert and opera singer
Evgen Sajovic (1880–1916), athletics specialist
Gvido Sajovic (1883–1920), natural scientist
Ivan Savnik (1879–1950), industrialist and merchant
Karel Šavnik (1874–1928), physician
Leo Šavnik (1897–1968), physician
Pavel Šavnik (1882–1924), dermatologist
Florijan Sentimer (1786–1836), physician
Andrej Šifrer (born 1952), musician
Ljubo Sirc (born 1920), economist
Fran Skaberne (1877–1951), lawyer
Minka Skaberne (1882–1965), education specialist
Viktor Skaberne (1878–1956), designer and construction engineer
Hinko Smrekar (1883–1942), painter
Blaž Snedic (c. 1631–1684), merchant and banker
Marjan Šorli (1915–1975), architect
Ivo Štempihar (1898–1955), journalist
Jurij Štempihar (1891–1978), lawyer
France Štiglic (1919–1993), film director and journalist
Andrej Štremfelj (born 1956), alpinist
Gustav Strniša (1887–1970), poet and children's writer
Suimon Strupi (1813–1880), veterinarian
Desanka Švara (Schwara) (born 1959), historian
Aliash Tepina, actor
Fidelis Terpinc (1799–1875), businessman
Tadej Valjavec (born 1977), cyclist
Anzelm Wissiak (1837–1876), painter
Edvard Wissiak (1841–1874), painter
Franz Wissiak (a.k.a. Franc Vizjak, 1810–1880), painter
Grega Žemlja (born 1986), tennis player
Janko Žirovnik (1855–1946), folk song collector and musician
Franc Zupanc (1853–1922), technical writer

References

External links

 Kranj on Geopedia
 Kranj city homepage
 Kranj tourist board

 
Populated places in the City Municipality of Kranj
Cities and towns in Upper Carniola